"Ridin' High" is a 1936 popular song written by Cole Porter, for his musical Red, Hot and Blue, where it was introduced by Ethel Merman.

Notable recordings
Benny Goodman and His Orchestra - 'Camel Caravan' (Live Broadcast Radio Program) (Nov. 2, 1937), arranged by Jimmy Mundy; Jazz Concert No. 2 (Columbia LP: ML 4590) (1952)
Chris Connor - This Is Chris (1955).
Ella Fitzgerald - Ella Fitzgerald Sings the Cole Porter Songbook (1956)
Michel Legrand & His Orchestra - The Columbia Album of Cole Porter (1957).
Kate Smith (1957) - included in the compilation CD Makin' Whoopee! - Capitol Sings Broadway (1995).
Mark Murphy - Let Yourself Go (1958), arranged by Ralph Burns
Jeri Southern - Southern Breeze (1958), arr. Marty Paich, reissued on CD as Southern Breeze/Coffee Cigarettes and Memories (1998)
Peggy Lee - Things Are Swingin' (1959), arranged by Jack Marshall
Teresa Brewer - Ridin' High (1960), arranged by Jerry Fielding
Carol Lawrence - An Evening With Carol Lawrence (1964)
Doris Day - Bright and Shiny (1961), arranged by Neal Hefti
Johnny Mathis - Broadway (1964)
Cleo Laine - Portrait (1971), arranged by John Dankworth
Sue Raney - Ridin' High (1984), with the Bob Florence quartet
Hod O'Brien - Ridin' High (1990).
Robert Palmer - Ridin' High (1992), arranged by Clare Fischer
Rebecca Martin - Middlehope (2000)
Fay Claassen - Red, Hot & Blue: The Music of Cole Porter (2008), arranged by Michael Abene
Stevie Holland - Love, Linda: The Life of Mrs. Cole Porter (Original Cast Album) (2010)

References

Songs from High Society (1956 film)
Songs from Cole Porter musicals
Ella Fitzgerald songs
1936 songs